Yi Seongbok (born 1952) is a South Korean poet known for his imaginative and multi-layered poetry.

Life
Yi Seongbok was born on June 4, 1952 in Gyeongsangbuk-do, Korea. Yi earned both his M.A. and B.A. from Seoul National University and has taught French Literature at Keimyung University in Daegu.

Career
Yi Seongbok's poetry evokes events and landscapes unfolding above a horizon of unlimited interpretive possibilities. As Kim Hyeon stated of Yi's poetry, "It vastly expands its meaning to permit endless questions, not only on an individual or private level, but on a collective and public one as well." Yi has attracted attention for his imaginative and multi-layered poetry which features European influences including Baudelaire, Kafka and Nietzsche and often attacks the corruption, hypocrisy, and perversion of the modern world.

Yi Seongbok's poetry suggests that all things exist in relation to other things, and that there is no core or isolated act. All binary categories—the collective versus individual or the social versus the ontological—are simultaneously one. But Yi's poetry does not deny opposition itself. Rather, through such distinctions, his poetic world reads more dynamically, and represents the overcoming of life's pain with the strength gained through the exchange of meanings from opposing categories

Selected works

Works in Korean (partial)
 When Will the Rolling Stone Awaken? (1980)
 Namhae's Gold Mountain (1986)
 The End of That Summer (1990)
 Memory of the Holly Tree (1993)
 In My Beloved Brothel (1996)
 Why Didn't I Say Anything About the Rain-Soaked Pomegranate Petals? (2001)
 Your Pain Won't Make the Leaves Turn Green (2001)
 Ah, Those Things Without Mouths (2003)
 Rippling Marks on the Moon's Brow (2003)
 Come To Be Sorrowful

Works in translation
 I Heard Life Calling Me: Poems of Yi Song-Bok (남해금산/ 뒹구는 돌)
 Wie anders sind die Nächte (아, 입이 없는 것들)

Awards
 Kim Suyeong Literature Prize (1982)
 Sowol Poetry Prize (1990)
 Contemporary Literature (Hyundae Munhak) Award (2008)

References 

1952 births
Korean writers
Living people